A Ministry of Railways is a Cabinet department that exists or has existed in many Commonwealth states as well as others. It generally occurs in countries where railroad transportation is a particularly important part of the national infrastructure. In countries that have railways, but no cabinet department specializing in overseeing them, this task will typically fall to a Ministry of Transport. The head of a Ministry of Railways is usually denoted Minister of Railways or Railway Minister.

Examples of Ministries of Railways include:

 Ministry of Railways (Bangladesh)
 Ministry of Railways (China)
 Ministry of Railways (India) (headed by the Minister of Railways (India))
 Ministry of Railways (Japan)
 Ministry of Railways (North Korea)
 Ministry of Railways (Pakistan)
 
 Ministry of Railways (Soviet Union)
 Minister of Railways and Canals (Canada)
 Minister of Railways (New Zealand)

References